Saros cycle series 135 for lunar eclipses occurs at the moon's descending node, repeats every 18 years 11 and 1/3 days. It contains 71 events.

This lunar saros is linked to Solar Saros 142.

This series contains 23 total eclipses. The first was on November 7, 1957, and the last will occur on July 6, 2354. The longest total eclipse will occur on May 12, 2264, and totality will last 106 minutes.

See also 
 List of lunar eclipses
 List of Saros series for lunar eclipses

Notes

External links 
 www.hermit.org: Saros 135

Lunar saros series